Prevention of Major Industrial Accidents Convention, 1993 is  an International Labour Organization Convention.

It was established in 1993, with the preamble stating:
Having decided upon the adoption of certain proposals with regard to the prevention of major industrial accidents,...

Ratifications

As of 2022, the convention has been ratified by 19 states.

External links 
Text.
Ratifications.

Health treaties
International Labour Organization conventions
Occupational safety and health treaties
Treaties concluded in 1993
Treaties entered into force in 1997
Treaties of Albania
Treaties of Armenia
Treaties of Bosnia and Herzegovina
Treaties of Belgium
Treaties of Brazil
Treaties of Colombia
Treaties of Estonia
Treaties of Finland
Treaties of India
Treaties of Lebanon
Treaties of Luxembourg
Treaties of the Netherlands
Treaties of Russia
Treaties of Saudi Arabia
Treaties of Slovenia
Treaties of Sweden
Treaties of Ukraine
Treaties of Zimbabwe
1993 in labor relations